Laura Jane Amanda White (born 31 August 1987) is an English singer-songwriter from Atherton in the Metropolitan Borough of Wigan, Greater Manchester. White is known for finishing in eighth place on the fifth series of The X Factor in 2008 and being the only singer to date raised in Parliament on her exit of the show. Her debut single "You Should Have Known" was released in 2009 and reached number 32 on the UK Singles Charts. Her debut extended play What My Mother Taught Me was released four years later in 2013. 

The song "New York Raining", co-written by her and performed by Charles Hamilton and Rita Ora, was included on the deluxe edition of the album Empire: Original Soundtrack from Season 1, which was nominated for a Grammy Award for Best Compilation Soundtrack.

Early life 
White has been singing and playing the piano since she was a young girl. Despite never having had a professional singing lesson, White began singing in jazz bars at the age of 15 and played many festivals. White went to Fred Longworth High School in Tyldesley, the same school as actors Anthony Quinlan, Leah Hackett and Oliver Lee. She studied her A-Levels in English Literature and Drama at Wigan and Leigh College, before going on to study creative writing at The University of Bolton.

Music career

2008–09: The X Factor
White auditioned for the 2008 series of The X Factor and reached the final live stages in the "Girls" category, mentored by Cheryl Cole. After performing Fallin', by Alicia Keys, on the first live show, White sang You Are Not Alone as part of Michael Jackson week the following episode. She then performed God Bless the Child, originally recorded by Billie Holiday, as part of the third week's focus on big band music, and Somebody Else's Guy, written and performed by Jocelyn Brown, on the fourth live show as part of disco week. After performing Endless Love by Lionel Richie and Diana Ross in the fifth week, White was voted off the show on 8 November, after a sing-off against Ruth Lorenzo.

After her elimination, fans of White circulated a petition for broadcasting watchdog Ofcom to investigate phone voting procedures on the show, complaining of a lack of transparency in the voting system and of difficulties in getting through to vote for White–allegations which were denied by a show spokesman. The issue was even mentioned in the Houses of Parliament by her local MP Andy Burnham, who commented that White's exit had been "very harsh".

2009–2012: What My Mother Taught Me

The Manchester Evening News reported on 11 November 2008 that White had been approached by an as-yet unnamed record company. White was chosen by Peterborough City Council to perform and turn on the annual Christmas lights at Cathedral Square, Peterborough. A crowd of 6,000 attended and cheered as the lights were turned on. White then went on to switch on the lights in the county capital Cambridge on the Sunday night. White was invited to the Brit Awards Launch Party as The X Factor contestant representing the "Hero" single. White was a judge in the 2009 Miss Manchester contest and sang at the Miss England contest. In early August 2009, White posted samples of four tracks onto her website. Fans were allowed to vote for one of the four to become her debut single. The candidates were: "You Should Have Known", "Touch You", "Got It Bad" and "Love Hurts". "You Should Have Known" was chosen as her debut single. The song was written by Ivor Novello-winning songwriter Michelle Escoffrey and produced by Ian Green, the man behind Madonna's autumn 2009 album Celebration. Speaking in October 2009 to noted UK R&B writer Pete Lewis of the award-winning Blues & Soul, White stated: "I'm really pleased to kick my whole album project off with 'You Should Have Known."

She performed her track "You Should Have Known" on GMTV on 19 August 2009. The video for the single "You Should Have Known" was shot in early September and was uploaded to White's official YouTube account. The single was released on 2 November 2009. To promote the single, White embarked on a promo tour of the UK. "You Should Have Known" debuted and peaked at No. 32 on the UK Singles Chart. White was also part of the alternative Haiti relief charity single "I Put A Spell on You".

White released her debut extended play, What My Mother Taught Me in 2013.

2012–present: Songwriting and No. 95

White has written songs for artists including Inna, Leona Lewis, Eliza Doolittle, and Cher Lloyd. White had her first number one with artist Gin Lee in 2012 and also penned songs for many Danish artists and Dutch X Factor winner Lisa Lois. White wrote "New York Raining" for Charles Hamilton & Rita Ora, which was featured on the soundtrack of the US TV show, Empire and nominated for a Grammy in 2015.

In 2016, White confirmed signing a publishing deal to Peer Publishing UK. She released her second extended play, No. 95 in February 2016. She also wrote and featured as a vocalist on the Galantis single, "Love on Me". In 2017, White wrote and featured on songs with Example, Bugzy Malone and confirmed her album was being written alongside featured production from Naughty Boy.

Discography

Extended plays

Singles

As lead artist

As featured artist

Songwriting credits

Tours 
White toured on The X Factor live tour, with fellow series 5 finalists. White was also touring with Peter Andre with his Revelation Tour. She continues to perform in gigs/festivals. She has performed her own shows at the Lowry Theatre Manchester, Camden Assembly London and more dates for 2020.

References

External links 
 

1989 births
Living people
English people of Scottish descent
People from Atherton, Greater Manchester
The X Factor (British TV series) contestants
English soul singers
English women pop singers
21st-century English women singers
21st-century English singers